Masud Arun is a Bangladesh Nationalist Party politician and the former Member of Parliament from Meherpur-1. His father Ahammad Ali was an MP too.

Career
Arun was elected to Parliament from Meherpur-1 in 2001 as a Bangladesh Nationalist Party candidate. He was sued in 2008 for fraud and embezzlement.

Personal life
His brother, Maruf Ahmed Bijon, was the public prosecutor of Meherpur District. He was arrested in 2002 for ransacking a police post and assaulting the officer-in-charge.

References

Living people
Year of birth missing (living people)
People from Meherpur District
Bangladesh Nationalist Party politicians
8th Jatiya Sangsad members